Pennsylvania Lines LLC was a limited liability company that owned railroad lines in the United States that are owned and operated by the Norfolk Southern Railway. The company was formed in 1998 to own Conrail lines assigned to Norfolk Southern in the split of Conrail between Norfolk Southern and CSX Transportation; operations were switched over on June 1, 1999. The company is named after the old Pennsylvania Railroad, whose old main line was a line of the new company. In November, 2003, the Surface Transportation Board approved a plan allowing Norfolk Southern to fully absorb Pennsylvania Lines LLC, which was done on August 27, 2004.

See also
New York Central Lines LLC

References
Surface Transportation Board, Docket FD_33388_0, CSX Corporation and CSX Transportation, Inc., Norfolk Southern Corporation and Norfolk Southern Railway Company--control and operating leases/agreements--Conrail Inc. and Consolidated Rail Corporation, July 23, 1998
Petition for Supplemental Order - detailing the absorption of Pennsylvania Lines, LLC by Norfolk Southern

Predecessors of the Norfolk Southern Railway
Pennsylvania Railroad
Conrail
Railway companies established in 1998
Railway companies disestablished in 2004